Tura Airport  is a small airport in Krasnoyarsk Krai, Russia located  northeast of Tura. KrasAvia operates flights to Krasnoyarsk Yemelyanovo Airport twice a week.

Airlines and destinations

References

Airports built in the Soviet Union
Airports in Krasnoyarsk Krai
Evenkiysky District